The 1993 Speedway World Pairs Championship was the twenty-fourth and last FIM Speedway World Pairs Championship. The final took place in Vojens, Denmark. The championship was won by Sweden (26 points) who beat United States (23 points) and host team Denmark (21 points).

Qualification round
  Wiener Neustadt
 ?

Semifinal 1
  Bydgoszcz
 June 6

Semifinal 2
  Miskolc
 June 6

Final
  Vojens, Speedway Center
 August 1

See also
 1993 Individual Speedway World Championship
 1993 Speedway World Team Cup
 motorcycle speedway
 1993 in sports

References

1993
World Pairs